Michael Daniel Harter (April 6, 1846 – February 22, 1896) was a two-term U.S. Representative from Ohio from 1891 to 1895. He was the grandson of Robert Moore.

Biography 
Born in Canton, Ohio, Harter attended the public schools.
He engaged in mercantile pursuits and banking.
He moved to Mansfield, Ohio, in 1869.
At the age of twenty-three became treasurer and manager of the Aultman &
Taylor Co. upon its organization.
He established the Harter Bank in 1866. He established the Isaac Harter Milling Company in Fostoria, the largest producer of flour in the state.

Harter was elected as a Democrat to the Fifty-second and Fifty-third Congresses (March 4, 1891 – March 3, 1895).
He declined to be a candidate for renomination in 1894.
In congress, he was strongly in favor of the Gold Standard, and against free silver, views in opposition to his own party. His views won out during the Panic of 1893, when congress, in special session, repealed the Sherman Silver Purchase Act.
He moved to Philadelphia, Pennsylvania, but spent his summers in Mansfield.

Death
He committed suicide in Fostoria, Ohio, February 22, 1896.
He was interred in Mansfield Cemetery, Mansfield, Ohio.

Family life
Harter was married to Mary L. Brown in 1869, and they had three sons and two daughters. His wife and children, except one daughter survived him.

References

Sources

1846 births
1896 deaths
American Lutherans
Politicians from Canton, Ohio
Politicians from Mansfield, Ohio
Suicides by firearm in Ohio
American politicians who committed suicide
19th-century American politicians
19th-century Lutherans
1890s suicides
Democratic Party members of the United States House of Representatives from Ohio